The L'eggs Mini-Marathon was a series of women only 10 kilometer (10K) road races held in the 1970s and 1980s, sponsored by the L'eggs hosiery company.   The race grew from a small single event in 1972 into a national series with the sponsorship.  The circuit consisted of three preliminary races, situated around the United States, in Dallas, Texas, Chicago, Illinois and San Diego, California leading to a big, nationally televised final race in New York City's Central Park, conducted by the New York Road Runners.  Tens of thousands of women participated in the series which allowed them to rub shoulders most of the female running elite of the time, such as Grete Waitz, Rosa Mota and Priscilla Welch.

Women's only road races were virtually unheard of at that point in time.  The event capitalized on three phenomenon of that era:  Feminism, Title IX, and the Running boom of the 1970s.  Many women, who had not previously thought of themselves as athletes achieved a feeling of self-empowerment by learning how to run, participating and completing the race.  They felt comforted in the festive environment surrounded by other women of varying abilities. There was a unity in accomplishing this together with other women.  For some, like Gerry Davidson and Gail Waesche Kislevitz, it was the only race they ran.

Results

Alumni
Margaret Groos
Ingrid Kristiansen
Lisa Martin
Rosa Mota
Joan Benoit Samuelson
Mary Decker Slaney
Priscilla Welch

References

Recurring sporting events established in 1972
10K runs in the United States
Sports competitions in New York City
Sports competitions in Chicago
Sports in Dallas
Sports in San Diego
Foot races in California